Eduard-Reinhold Virgo (16 October 1878 Päide village, Rakvere Parish – 28 April 1938 Tallinn) was an Estonian journalist, diplomat, and translator.

From 1903 to 1906 he studied in France at the School for Advanced Studies in the Social Sciences, and also at the Sorbonne. He participated in World War I. In 1918 he was a member of the delegation of Estonia, being the envoy of Estonia to Rome and London. In 1919 he established the Estonian News Agency. From 1928 to 1931 he was the envoy of Estonia to Riga.

Awards
 1936: Order of the Cross of the Eagle, II class.

References

1878 births
1938 deaths
Estonian journalists
Estonian diplomats
Estonian translators
Recipients of the Military Order of the Cross of the Eagle, Class II
School for Advanced Studies in the Social Sciences alumni
People from Rakvere Parish